Superlek Kiatmookao (ซุปเปอร์เล็ก เกียรติหมู่9) (born 6 November 1995) is a Thai Muay Thai fighter originally from Buriram in the northeast of Thailand. He is the current ONE Kickboxing Flyweight World Champion, he is also former two-weight Lumpinee Stadium champion and the former WBC Muaythai Super featherweight World champion. He was voted the Sports Authority of Thailand 2012 Muay Thai Fighter of the Year.

Superlek is from the same Muay Thai gym of his uncle and multiple-time Lumpinee Stadium champion Singdam Kiatmuu9.

Superlek is a teammate of Petpanomrung Kiatmuu9. Aside from Thailand's stadium circuit, Superlek has also competed on ONE Championship.

Superlek is currently ranked #2 in both the ONE Flyweight Muay Thai rankings and the ONE Flyweight Kickboxing rankings. As of December 2020 he is the number 3 pound-for-pound fighter in the world according to The Nation.

Muay Thai career
On 16 February 2019, Superlek made his ONE Championship debut against Lao Chetra at ONE Championship: Clash of Legends. Dominating the fight with a high volume of right kicks, Superlek went on to secure the unanimous decision victory.

Superlek returned to ONE Championship on 10 May 2019 at ONE Championship: Warriors of Light. Facing Rui Botelho, Superlek won the fight by unanimous decision.

On 31 July 2020, Superlek faced Panpayak Jitmuangnon at ONE Championship: No Surrender for a seventh time. He won the fight by a unanimous decision to improve to 2–4–1 against Panpayak all-time.

Superlek was scheduled to fight Fahdi Khaled during ONE Championship: A New Breed 2 on 21 August 2020. He defeated Khaled by a unanimous decision.

Superlek is scheduled to challenge Ilias Ennahachi for the ONE Flyweight Kickboxing World Championship at ONE Championship: Fists Of Fury on 26 February 2021. He lost by a controversial unanimous decision.

Due to the highly controversial nature of the decision, ONE CEO Chatri Sityodtong announced an immediate title rematch between Superlek and Ennahachi.

Superlek was booked to face Tagir Khalilov at ONE: Lights Out on 11 March 2022. However, the bout was scrapped.

Superlek was scheduled to face former Shoot boxing and RISE champion Taiki Naito in the ONE Muay Thai Flyweight Grand Prix quarterfinal at ONE 157 on 20 May 2022. He won by unanimous decision.

Superlek faced Walter Goncalves in the quarterfinals of the ONE Muay Thai Flyweight Grand Prix at ONE on Prime Video 1 on 27 August 2022. He won after knocking out Goncalves with an elbow in the first round.

Superlek was scheduled to face Panpayak Jitmuangnon in the ONE Flyweight Muay Thai World Grand Prix Tournament final bout on October 22, 2022, at ONE on Prime Video 3. However, Superlek withdrawn from the event due to training injuries. The pair was rescheduled to meet at ONE 164 on December 3, 2022. At weigh-ins, the pair failed to make weight in the flyweight division and disqualified from the tournament, agreed to compete in the 138 lbs catchweight. He won the fight by split decision.

The rematch between Superlek and Ilias Ennahachi was scheduled on January 14, 2022, at ONE on Prime Video 6. However, Ennahachi pulled out due to his inability to make the flyweight limit of 135 pounds while hydrated, he decided to vacated the title. Therefore Superlek instead faced Daniel Puertas for the vacant championship. He won the fight via unanimous decision, which earned him the title.

Superlek is scheduled to make his first ONE Flyweight Kickboxing World Championship against the ONE Flyweight Muay Thai World champion Rodtang Jitmuangnon at ONE Fight Night 8 on March 25, 2023.

Titles and accomplishments
ONE Championship
ONE Flyweight Kickboxing World Championship (One time; current)
Performance of the Night (One time) 
Petchyindee True4U
 2022 True4U 140 lbs Champion
Muay Thai Nai Khanom Tom Association 
 2018 Nai Khanom Tom Champion
WBC Muaythai
 2016 WBC Super Featherweight 130lbs. World Champion
Professional Boxing Association of Thailand (PAT) 
 2013 Thailand Featherweight 126lbs. Champion
 2012 Thailand Flyweight 112lbs. Champion
 2011 Thailand Mini Flyweight 105lbs. Champion
Lumpinee Stadium 
 2013 Lumpinee Stadium Bantamweight 118lbs. Champion
 2012 Lumpinee Stadium Super Flyweight 115lbs. Champion(One Title Defense)
 Sports Authority of Thailand 
 2012 Sports Authority of Thailand Muay Thai Fighter of the Year

Fight record

|-  style="background:#;"
| 2023-03-25||   ||align=left| Rodtang Jitmuangnon ||  ONE Fight Night 8 || Kallang, Singapore ||   ||   || 
|-
! style=background:White colspan=9 |
|-  style="background:#cfc;"
| 2023-01-14|| Win ||align=left| Daniel Puertas Gallardo || ONE Fight Night 6 || Bangkok, Thailand || Decision (unanimous) || 5 || 3:00
|-
! style=background:White colspan=9 |
|-  style="background:#cfc;"
| 2022-12-03 || Win ||align=left| Panpayak Jitmuangnon ||  ONE 164 || Manila, Philippines || Decision (Split) || 3 || 3:00
|-
|-  style="background:#cfc;"
| 2022-08-27|| Win ||align=left| Walter Goncalves || ONE on Prime Video 1 || Kallang, Singapore || KO (Elbow) || 1 || 1:35
|-
! style=background:white colspan=9 |
|-  style="background:#cfc;"
| 2022-05-20|| Win ||align=left| Taiki Naito || ONE 157 || Kallang, Singapore || Decision (Unanimous) || 3 || 3:00 
|-
! style=background:white colspan=9 |

|-  style="background:#cfc;"
| 2022-04-07|| Win ||align=left| Superball Tded99 ||  Petchyindee, Rajadamnern Stadium || Bangkok, Thailand || Decision (Unanimous) || 5 || 3:00
|-
! style=background:white colspan=9 |
|-
|-  style="background:#cfc;"
| 2021-04-08|| Win ||align=left| Rungkit Wor.Sanprapai || Mahakam MuayRuamPonKon Chana + Petchyindee|| Songkhla Province, Thailand || Decision || 5 || 3:00
|-  style="background:#fbb;"
| 2021-02-26|| Loss ||align=left| Ilias Ennahachi || ONE Championship: Fists Of Fury || Kallang, Singapore || Decision (Unanimous) || 5 || 3:00 
|-
! style=background:white colspan=9 |
|-  style="background:#CCFFCC;"
| 2020-09-11|| Win ||align=left| Fahdi Khaled || ONE Championship: A New Breed 2 ||Bangkok, Thailand || Decision (Unanimous) || 3 || 3:00
|-  style="background:#CCFFCC;"
| 2020-07-31|| Win ||align=left| Panpayak Jitmuangnon || ONE Championship: No Surrender ||Bangkok, Thailand || Decision (Unanimous) || 3 || 3:00
|-  style="background:#CCFFCC;"
| 2019-12-23|| Win ||align=left| Superball Tded99 || Rajadamnern Stadium 74th Anniversary ||Bangkok, Thailand || Decision (Unanimous)|| 5 || 3:00
|-  style="background:#CCFFCC;"
| 2019-11-07|| Win ||align=left| Suakim PK Saenchaimuaythaigym||Ruamponkon Prachin	  ||Prachinburi, Thailand|| Decision || 5 || 3:00
|-  style="background:#c5d2ea;"
| 2019-10-05||Draw||align=left| Kaonar P.K.SaenchaiMuaythaiGym || Yod Muay Thai Naikhanomton || Buriram, Thailand ||Decision || 5 || 3:00
|-  style="background:#CCFFCC;"
| 2019-09-05|| Win ||align=left| Rungkit Wor.Sanprapai || Rajadamnern Stadium ||Bangkok, Thailand || Decision || 5 || 3:00
|-  style="background:#CCFFCC;"
| 2019-08-08|| Win  ||align=left| Rangkhao Wor.Sangprapai || Rajadamnern Stadium || Bangkok, Thailand || Decision || 5 || 3:00
|-  style="background:#fbb;"
| 2019-07-11|| Loss ||align=left| Rangkhao Wor.Sangprapai || Rajadamnern Stadium || Bangkok, Thailand || Decision || 5 || 3:00 
|-
! style=background:white colspan=9 |
|-  style="background:#CCFFCC;"
| 2019-05-10|| Win ||align=left| Rui Botelho || ONE Championship: Warriors Of Light ||Bangkok, Thailand || Decision (Unanimous) || 3 || 3:00
|-  style="background:#CCFFCC;"
| 2019-04-04|| Win ||align=left| Rungkit Morbeskamala || Rajadamnern Stadium ||Bangkok, Thailand || Decision || 5 || 3:00
|-  style="background:#CCFFCC;"
| 2019-02-16|| Win ||align=left| Lao Chetra || ONE Championship: Clash of Legends ||Thailand || Decision (Unanimous)|| 3 || 3:00
|-  style="background:#fbb;"
| 2018-12-26|| Loss ||align=left| Kaonar P.K.SaenchaiMuaythaiGym || Rajadamnern Stadium || Bangkok, Thailand || Decision || 5 || 3:00
|-  style="background:#CCFFCC;"
| 2018-10-29|| Win ||align=left| Cristian Opazos || Yokkao 33 & 34 ||Hong Kong || KO (Right Elbow)|| 1 || 1:42
|-  style="background:#cfc;"
| 2018-10-05 || Win  ||align=left| Muangthai PKSaenchaimuaythaigym || Muaythai Expo || Buriram, Thailand || Decision || 5 || 3:00
|-  style="background:#CCFFCC;"
| 2018-10-13|| Win ||align=left| Jonathan Haggerty || Yokkao 31 & 32 ||United Kingdom || TKO (Doctor Stoppage/Cut)|| 2 || 3:00
|-  style="background:#fbb;"
| 2018-08-17|| Loss ||align=left| Panpayak Jitmuangnon || Rajadamnern Stadium || Bangkok, Thailand || Decision || 5 || 3:00 
|-  style="background:#c5d2ea;"
| 2018-06-14|| Draw ||align=left| Phet Utong Or. Kwanmuang || Rajadamnern Stadium || Bangkok, Thailand || Decision || 5 || 3:00
|-  style="background:#CCFFCC;"
| 2018-01-25|| Win ||align=left| Phet Utong Or. Kwanmuang || Rajadamnern Stadium || Bangkok, Thailand || Decision || 5 || 3:00
|-  style="background:#fbb;"
| 2017-12-30|| Loss ||align=left| Panpayak Jitmuangnon ||Phetchbuncha Stadium || Ko Samui, Thailand || Decision || 5 || 3:00
|-  style="background:#c5d2ea;"
| 2017-12-08|| Draw||align=left| Muangthai PKSaenchaimuaythaigym || Lumpinee Stadium || Bangkok, Thailand || Decision || 5 || 3:00
|-  style="background:#CCFFCC;"
| 2017-10-15|| Win ||align=left| Christopher Shaw || Yokkao 27 ||  England || Decision (Unanimous) || 5 || 3:00
|-  style="background:#CCFFCC;"
| 2017-09-08|| Win ||align=left| Muangthai PKSaenchaimuaythaigym ||Lumpinee Stadium || Bangkok, Thailand || Decision || 5 || 3:00
|-  style="background:#CCFFCC;"
| 2017-08-06 || Win ||align=left| Sho Ogawa|| Suk Wanchai MuayThai Super Fight || Nagoya, Japan || TKO (Doctor Stoppage/Elbow) || 3 || 2:05
|-  style="background:#CCFFCC;"
| 2017-06-05|| Win ||align=left| Kaimukkao Por.Thairongruangkamai ||Rajadamnern Stadium || Bangkok, Thailand || KO (Right Upper Elbow) || 2 ||
|-  style="background:#fbb;"
| 2017-05-04|| Loss ||align=left| Panpayak Jitmuangnon ||Rajadamnern Stadium || Bangkok, Thailand || Decision || 5 || 3:00
|-  style="background:#CCFFCC;"
| 2017-04-06|| Win ||align=left| Sangmanee Sor Tienpo ||Rajadamnern Stadium || Bangkok, Thailand || Decision || 5 || 3:00
|-  style="background:#CCFFCC;"
| 2017-02-02|| Win ||align=left| Panpayak Jitmuangnon ||Rajadamnern Stadium || Bangkok, Thailand || Decision || 5 || 3:00
|-  style="background:#fbb;"
| 2016-12-22|| Loss||align=left| Phet Utong Or. Kwanmuang  || Rajadamnern Stadium || Bangkok, Thailand || Decision || 5 || 3:00
|-  style="background:#CCFFCC;"
| 2016-11-14|| Win ||align=left| Saeksan Or. Kwanmuang ||Rajadamnern Stadium || Bangkok, Thailand || Decision || 5 || 3:00
|-  style="background:#CCFFCC;"
| 2016-10-09|| Win ||align=left| Yasuyuki  || Suk Wanchai  || Japan || KO (Right High Kick)|| 2 || 2:15
|-  style="background:#CCFFCC;"
| 2016-09-23|| Win ||align=left| Saeksan Or. Kwanmuang ||Lumpinee Stadium || Bangkok, Thailand || Decision || 5 || 3:00
|-
! style=background:white colspan=9 |
|-  style="background:#CCFFCC;"
| 2016-07-27|| Win ||align=left|    Petngam Kiatkamphon    || Rajadamnern Stadium || Bangkok, Thailand || Decision|| 5 || 3:00
|-  style="background:#CCFFCC;"
| 2016-06-20|| Win ||align=left|   Kaewkangwan Priewwayo    || Rajadamnern Stadium || Bangkok, Thailand || Decision|| 5 || 3:00
|-  style="background:#CCFFCC;"
| 2016-05-09|| Win ||align=left|   Bangpleenoi 96Penang    || Rajadamnern Stadium || Bangkok, Thailand || KO (Right Up Elbow)|| 2 || 1:15
|-  style="background:#CCFFCC;"
| 2016-04-07|| Win ||align=left|  Superball Tded99   || Rajadamnern Stadium || Bangkok, Thailand || TKO (Right Low Kicks)|| 3 || 1:40
|-  style="background:#fbb;"
| 2016-03-07|| Loss ||align=left|  Kaewkangwan Priewwayo   || Rajadamnern Stadium || Bangkok, Thailand || Decision || 5 || 3:00
|-  style="background:#CCFFCC;"
| 2015-11-09|| Win ||align=left|  Bangpleenoi 96Penang    || Rajadamnern Stadium || Bangkok, Thailand || Decision || 5 || 3:00
|-  style="background:#fbb;"
| 2015-10-07|| Loss ||align=left| Panpayak Jitmuangnon   || Rajadamnern Stadium || Bangkok, Thailand || Decision || 5 || 3:00
|-  style="background:#c5d2ea;"
| 2015-09-09|| Draw||align=left| Panpayak Jitmuangnon   || Rajadamnern Stadium || Bangkok, Thailand || Decision || 5 || 3:00
|- style="background:#fbb;"
| 2015-08-11 || Loss ||align=left| Kaonar P.K.SaenchaiMuaythaiGym  || Lumpinee Stadium  || Bangkok, Thailand || Decision || 5 || 3:00
|-  style="background:#fbb;"
| 2015-07-15|| Loss||align=left| Phet Utong Or. Kwanmuang  || Rajadamnern Stadium || Bangkok, Thailand || Decision || 5 || 3:00
|-  style="background:#fbb;"
| 2015-05-08|| Loss||align=left| Saen Parunchai   || Lumpinee Stadium || Bangkok, Thailand || Decision|| 5 || 3:00
|-  style="background:#CCFFCC;"
| 2015-04-08|| Win ||align=left|  Bangpleenoi 96Penang    || Rajadamnern Stadium || Bangkok, Thailand || Decision || 5 || 3:00
|-  style="background:#CCFFCC;"
| 2015-01-26|| Win ||align=left|  Sangthongnoi Tanasuranakhon    || Rajadamnern Stadium || Bangkok, Thailand || Decision || 5 || 3:00
|-  style="background:#CCFFCC;"
| 2014-12-24|| Win ||align=left| Jompichit Sitchefboontam    || Rajadamnern Stadium || Bangkok, Thailand || Decision || 5 || 3:00
|-  style="background:#fbb;"
| 2014-10-28|| Loss||align=left| Phet Utong Or. Kwanmuang  || Lumpinee Stadium || Bangkok, Thailand || TKO (Doctor Stoppage/Cut)|| 4 || 1:49
|-  style="background:#CCFFCC;"
| 2014-10-09|| Win ||align=left| Kaimukkao Por.Thairongruangkamai    || Rajadamnern Stadium || Bangkok, Thailand || KO (Right High Kick)|| 3 || 2:49
|-  style="background:#CCFFCC;"
| 2014-09-10|| Win ||align=left| Pornsanae Sitmonchai    || Rajadamnern Stadium || Bangkok, Thailand || KO (Right High Kick)|| 1 || 2:38
|-  style="background:#CCFFCC;"
| 2014-08-14|| Win ||align=left| Thanonchai Thanakorngym  || Rajadamnern Stadium || Bangkok, Thailand || Decision || 5 || 3:00
|-  style="background:#fbb;"
| 2014-07-15 || Loss||align=left| Thaksinlek Kiatniwat   || Lumpinee Stadium || Bangkok, Thailand || Decision || 5 || 3:00
|-  style="background:#CCFFCC;"
| 2014-06-11|| Win ||align=left| Palangtip Nor Sripueng    || Rajadamnern Stadium || Bangkok, Thailand || TKO (Doctor Stoppage/Broken Jaw)|| 3 || 3:00
|-  style="background:#fbb;"
| 2014-05-06 || Loss||align=left| Superbank Sakchaichode  || Lumpinee Stadium || Bangkok, Thailand || Decision || 5 || 3:00
|-
! style=background:white colspan=9 |
|-  style="background:#CCFFCC;"
| 2014-03-30|| Win ||align=left| Superbank Sakchaichode  || Songkla || Southern Thailand || Decision || 5 || 3:00
|-  style="background:#fbb;"
| 2014-02-28 || Loss||align=left| Sangmanee Sor Tienpo  || Lumpinee King Fighter 4 Man Tournament Semi Finals, Lumpinee Stadium || Bangkok, Thailand || Decision || 3 || 3:00
|-  style="background:#CCFFCC;"
| 2014-01-14|| Win ||align=left| Rungpet Gaiyanghadao   ||Omnoi Stadium || Bangkok, Thailand || Decision || 5 || 3:00
|-  style="background:#CCFFCC;"
| 2013-12-03|| Win ||align=left| Thanonchai Thanakorngym  ||Lumpinee Stadium || Bangkok, Thailand || Decision || 5 || 3:00
|-
! style=background:white colspan=9 |
|-  style="background:#CCFFCC;"
| 2013-11-04|| Win ||align=left| Tong Puideenaidee   ||Rajadamnern Stadium || Bangkok, Thailand || Decision || 5 || 3:00
|-  style="background:#fbb;"
| 2013-10-11 ||Loss||align=left| Rungpet Gaiyanghadao  || Lumpinee Stadium || Bangkok, Thailand || Decision || 5 || 3:00
|-  style="background:#fbb;"
| 2013-09-04 ||Loss||align=left| Sam-A Kaiyanghadaogym  || Rajadamnern Stadium || Bangkok, Thailand || Decision || 5 || 3:00
|-  style="background:#fbb;"
| 2013-07-12||Loss||align=left| Sam-A Kaiyanghadaogym  || Lumpinee Stadium || Bangkok, Thailand || Decision || 5 || 3:00
|-
! style=background:white colspan=9 |
|-  style="background:#CCFFCC;"
| 2013-06-07|| Win ||align=left| Mondam Sor Werapon   ||Lumpinee Stadium || Bangkok, Thailand || KO (Right Elbow)|| 3 || 1:22
|-
! style=background:white colspan=9 |
|-  style="background:#CCFFCC;"
| 2013-05-17|| Win ||align=left| Fonluang Sitboonmee    ||Lumpinee Stadium || Bangkok, Thailand || Decision|| 5 || 3:00
|-  style="background:#CCFFCC;"
| 2013-04-16|| Win ||align=left| Rungpet Gaiyanghadao   ||Lumpinee Stadium || Bangkok, Thailand || KO (Right Up Elbow)|| 3 || 1:37
|-  style="background:#fbb;"
| 2013-03-08 || Loss ||align=left| Mondam Sor Werapon  || Lumpinee Stadium || Bangkok, Thailand || Decision || 5 || 3:00
|-
! style=background:white colspan=9 |
|-  style="background:#fbb;"
| 2013-02-15 || Loss ||align=left| Mondam Sor Werapon  || Lumpinee Stadium || Bangkok, Thailand || Decision || 5 || 3:00
|-  style="background:#fbb;"
| 2013-01-04 || Loss ||align=left| Wanchalong Sitsornong  || Lumpinee Stadium || Bangkok, Thailand || Decision || 5 || 3:00
|-  style="background:#CCFFCC;"
| 2012-12-07 || Win||align=left| Sangmanee Sor Tienpo  || Lumpinee Stadium || Bangkok, Thailand || Decision || 5 || 3:00
|-
! style=background:white colspan=9 |
|-  style="background:#CCFFCC;"
| 2012-11-02 || Win||align=left| Mondam Sor Werapon  || Lumpinee Stadium || Bangkok, Thailand || Decision || 5 || 3:00
|-  style="background:#CCFFCC;"
| 2012-10-09 || Win||align=left| Muangthai PKSaenchaimuaythaigym  || Lumpinee Stadium || Bangkok, Thailand || Decision || 5 || 3:00
|-  style="background:#CCFFCC;"
| 2012-09-07 || Win||align=left| Muangthai PKSaenchaimuaythaigym  || Lumpinee Stadium || Bangkok, Thailand || Decision || 5 || 3:00
|-
! style=background:white colspan=9 |
|-  style="background:#CCFFCC;"
| 2012-08-17 || Win||align=left| Hongtonglek Chorfahpiansi  || Lumpinee Stadium || Bangkok, Thailand || Decision || 5 || 3:00

|-  style="background:#CCFFCC;"
| 2012-06-08 || Win||align=left| Palangpon WatcharachaiGym || Lumpinee Stadium || Bangkok, Thailand || Decision || 5 || 3:00
|-  style="background:#fbb;"
| 2012-05-04 || Loss||align=left| Choknumchai Sitjakong  || Lumpinee Stadium || Bangkok, Thailand || Decision || 5 || 3:00

|-  style="background:#CCFFCC;"
| 2012-03-27 || Win||align=left| Palangpon WatcharachaiGym || Lumpinee Stadium || Bangkok, Thailand || Decision || 5 || 3:00
|-  style="background:#CCFFCC;"
| 2012-03-02 || Win||align=left| Wanchai Rambo-Esarn  || Lumpinee Stadium || Bangkok, Thailand || Decision || 5 || 3:00
|-  style="background:#fbb;"
| 2012-02-03 || Loss ||align=left| Wanchai Rambo-Esarn || Lumpinee Stadium || Bangkok, Thailand || Decision || 5 || 3:00
|-  style="background:#CCFFCC;"
| 2012-01-03 || Win||align=left| Sarawuth Pithakpabhadiang  || Lumpinee Stadium || Bangkok, Thailand || Decision || 5 || 3:00
|-  style="background:#CCFFCC;"
| 2011-11-25 || Win||align=left| Petsakon F.A.Group  || Lumpinee Stadium || Bangkok, Thailand || Decision || 5 || 3:00
|-  style="background:#CCFFCC;"
| 2011-10-18 || Win||align=left| Design Rajanont  || Lumpinee Stadium || Bangkok, Thailand || Decision || 5 || 3:00
|-  style="background:#FFBBBB;"
| 2011-04-26 || Loss ||align=left| ET Phetsomnuak  || Lumpinee Stadium || Bangkok, Thailand || Decision || 5 || 3:00
|-  style="background:#FFBBBB;"
| 2010-12-29 || Loss ||align=left| Littewada Sitthikul || Lumpinee Stadium || Bangkok, Thailand || Decision || 5 || 3:00
|-
| colspan=9 | Legend:

See also
 List of male kickboxers

External links
ONE Championship profile

References

Superlek Kiatmuu9
Living people
1995 births
Superlek Kiatmuu9
Featherweight kickboxers
ONE Championship kickboxers